Hypomecis buchholzaria, known generally as the blue spiderwort moth or Buchholz's gray, is a species of geometrid moth in the family Geometridae. It is found in North America.

The MONA or Hodges number for Hypomecis buchholzaria is 6438.

References

Further reading

 

Boarmiini
Articles created by Qbugbot
Moths described in 1937